Khorinsky District (Khoriin aimag) is an administrative and municipal district (raion), one of the twenty-one in the Republic of Buryatia, Russia. It is located in the center of the republic. Its administrative center is the rural locality (a selo) of Khorinsk. As of the 2010 Census, the total population of the district was 18,467, with the population of Khorinsk accounting for 44.1% of that number.

History

The district was established in November 1923.

Administrative and municipal status
Within the framework of administrative divisions, Khorinsky District is one of the twenty-one in the Republic of Buryatia. The district is divided into seven selsoviets and three somons, which comprise twenty-seven rural localities. As a municipal division, the district is incorporated as Khorinsky Municipal District. Its seven selsoviets and three somons are incorporated as nine rural settlements within the municipal district. The selo of Khorinsk serves as the administrative center of both the administrative and municipal district.

References

Notes

Sources

Districts of Buryatia
States and territories established in 1923
1923 establishments in the Soviet Union